The 199th Infantry Regiment is a regiment of the United States Army, Louisiana Army National Guard.  They are no longer a maneuver element, and today perform duties as a Regional Training Institute at Camp Beauregard, LA.  The 199th Infantry Regiment was formed on 1 May 1952 and served the state of Louisiana until 4 August 1960, when it was consolidated with the 156th Infantry Regiment.  Between 1960 and 1997, the remnants of the 199th became known as the Louisiana Military Academy, and conducted training for the Guard. The regiment was reactivated on 3 July 1997 as the 199th Regiment, in order to serve as the Louisiana National Guard's RTI.  Today, they teach the following courses; Officer Candidate School (OCS), Warrior Leadership Course (WLC), Advanced Leadership Course, Military Police School (31B), Horizontal Engineer School (12N), Vertical Engineer School (12W), and Transportation School (88M).

References

199
199
Military units and formations established in 1952